The American Society for Investigative Pathology (ASIP) is a society of biomedical scientists who investigate mechanisms of disease.
ASIP membership includes scientists in the academic, government, hospital, and pharmaceutical arenas that focus their research on the pathogenesis, classification, diagnosis and manifestations of disease. Research findings are ultimately used in the understanding, diagnosis and treatment of human diseases. The word pathology is derived from the Greek word "pathos" meaning "disease."

ASIP traces its earliest beginnings to the Boston Society of Medical Sciences that was begun in 1869 by a group of faculty from Harvard Medical School. In 1901 the American Association of Pathologists and Bacteriologists (AAPB) was established.  In 1976 the AAPB and the American Society for Experimental Pathology (ASEP) joined to form the American Association of Pathologists (AAP), which in 1992 became ASIP.

ASIP is a member of the Federation of American Societies for Experimental Biology (FASEB), a coalition of 27 independent societies that includes over 125,000 biomedical scientists from around the world.  FASEB plays an active role in lobbying for the interests of its constituents.

Scientific Interest Groups
Scientific Interest Groups (SIGs) represent the specialty interests of the membership, and include Biobanking, Breast Cancer, Cell Injury, Digital and Computational Pathology, Environmental and Toxicologic Pathology, Gene Expression, Immunohistochemistry and Microscopy, Inflammation/Immunopathology, Informatics, Liver Pathobiology, Molecular Diagnostic Pathology, Neoplasia/Growth Regulation, Neuropathology, Pulmonary Pathobiology, Regenerative Medicine and Stem Cells, Tumor Microenvironment and Metastasis, Vascular and Mucosal Pathobiology, and Veterinary Pathology

Publications
The American Journal of Pathology (AJP), official journal of the American Society for Investigative Pathology, publishes articles on the cellular and molecular biology of disease.

The Journal of Molecular Diagnostics (JMD), co-owned by the American Society for Investigative Pathology and the Association for Molecular Pathology, publishes articles on scientific advances in the translation and validation of molecular discoveries in medicine into the clinical diagnostic setting, and the description and application of technological advances in the field of molecular diagnostic medicine.

Scientific meetings
The ASIP Annual Meeting at Experimental Biology features current topics in disease pathogenesis, including both mechanistic and translational aspects of pathology research. Programming includes several major symposia, workshops, educational sessions, award lectures, and other special sessions that feature nationally and internationally recognized investigators and speakers. Various aspects of professional growth and advancement are presented in career development workshops that specifically address the needs of MD, MD/PhD, PhD, and other trainees. Additional sessions are programmed from abstract submissions to the ASIP topic categories covering a wide variety of subjects related to pathogenesis research.

The Pathobiology for Investigators, Students, and Academicians (PISA) Meeting features lectures presented by the leading scientists in their field. Abstract-driven sessions and poster discussions offer a cordial, collegial and contemporary environment for learning and networking as well as an intimate setting for intellectual exchange and constructive criticism, especially for trainees and junior faculty.

Current president
Daniel G. Remick

Past presidents

2016 George K. Michalopoulos
2015 William B. Coleman
2014 Kevin A. Roth
2013 James M. Musser
2012 Elizabeth R. Unger  
2011 Martha Furie
2010 Chuck Parkos
2009 Stanley Cohen
2008 Linda M. McManus
2007 Mark L. Tykocinski
2006 Peter M. Howley
2005 Stephen J. Galli
2004 Nelson Fausto
2003 Abul K. Abbas
2002 Fred P. Sanfilippo
2001 Avrum I. Gotlieb
2000 T. Collins
1999 M. E. Sobel
1998 V. Kumar 
1997 H. F. Dvorak
1996 D. G. Kaufman
1995 R. G. Lynch
1994 R. Ross
1993 M. W. Lieberman
1992 M. A. Gimbrone, Jr.
1991 M. E. Lamm
1990 D. F. Bainton
1989 T. S. Edgington
1988 E. R. Unanue
1987 D. Korn
1986 R. S. Cotran
1985 C. G. Becker
1984 J. W. Grisham
1983 P. E. Lacy
1982 D. G. Scarpelli
1981 V. T. Marchesi
1980 F. F. Becker
1979 P. A. Ward
1978 R. E. Anderson, and M. J. Karnovsky
1977 G. B. Pierce
1976 R. B. Hill, Jr. and H. C. Pitot
1951 Frieda Robscheit-Robbins
1921 Frederick George Novy

References

External links
"A New Editor on the Occasion of the Centennial Celebration of the Journal"
"The American Journal of Pathology"
"The Journal of Molecular Diagnostics"
"Intersociety Council for Pathology Information (ICPI)"
"Intersociety Pathology Council (IPC)"

Pathology organizations
Medical associations based in the United States
Scientific organizations established in 1976
1869 establishments in Massachusetts
Medical and health organizations based in Maryland